Pivín is a municipality and village in Prostějov District in the Olomouc Region of the Czech Republic. It has about 700 inhabitants.

History
The first written mention of Pivín is from 1321.

References

Villages in Prostějov District